"Into Me" is a single by singer-songwriter Chantal Kreviazuk which was released on October 9, 2015. Into Me was Kreviazuk's first recording through Warner Music Canada. It is included as the third track on her sixth studio album Hard Sail.

Music video
A lyric video for the song was released on December 15, 2015, through Warner Music Canada The official music video for Into Me, which was released on January 18, 2016, features two principal dancers from the National Ballet of Canada, Heather Ogden and her husband, Guillaume Côté, the song is, according to Kreviazuk, "about the art form of relationships and how they are really hard work but if you keep going and you keep trying then this beautiful masterpiece does come out of it".

References

External links
Official music video
Official lyrics video

Chantal Kreviazuk songs
2015 singles
2015 songs
Songs written by Tawgs Salter
Songs written by Chantal Kreviazuk